Extragalactic astronomy is the branch of astronomy concerned with objects outside the Milky Way galaxy. In other words, it is the study of all astronomical objects which are not covered by galactic astronomy.

The closest objects in extragalactic astronomy include the galaxies of the Local Group, which are close enough to allow very detailed analyses of their contents (e.g. supernova remnants, stellar associations). As instrumentation has improved, distant objects can now be examined in more detail and so extragalactic astronomy includes objects at nearly the edge of the observable universe. Research into distant galaxies (outside of our local group) is valuable for studying aspects of the universe such as galaxy evolution and Active Galactic Nuclei (AGN) which give insight into physical phenomena (e.g.  super massive black hole accretion and the presence of dark matter). It is through extragalactic astronomy that astronomers and physicists are able to study the effects of General Relativity such as gravitational lensing and gravitational waves, that are otherwise impossible (or nearly impossible) to study on a galactic scale.

Famous examples 

 Hubble Deep Field
 LIGO's detection of gravitational waves
 Chandra Deep Field South

Topics 
Active Galactic Nuclei (AGN), Quasars
Dark Matter
Galaxy clusters, Superclusters
Intergalactic stars
Intergalactic dust
 the observable universe
Radio galaxies
Supernovae
Extragalactic planet

See also
 Andromeda–Milky Way collision
 Galaxy color–magnitude diagram
 Galaxy formation and evolution
 Observational cosmology

References

 
Astronomical sub-disciplines
Physical cosmology
Edwin Hubble